The Turn of the Wheel is a lost 1918 American silent romantic drama film produced and distributed by Goldwyn Pictures. Reginald Barker directed and Geraldine Farrar starred.

Plot
As described in a film magazine, Rosalie Dean (Farrar) dissuades Maxfield Grey (Rawlinson) of suicide at Monte Carlo and loans him 100 francs, with which he regains his losses. They become fast friends. Without warning, Maxfield is arrested for the murder of his wife in New York and Rosalie is taken in as an accomplice. Rosalie proves an alibi, but Maxfield is returned for trial. He refuses to admit or deny his guilt, and Rosalie, convinced that he is innocent, sets about to find the truth. By shrewdly playing upon the weakness of Wally Gage (Short), she discovers that the shooting was accidental. Maxfield had been maintaining his silence to prevent his brother from being dragged into the mire because of a liaison between his brother's wife and Gage, and that they had been meeting at Maxfield's home with the consent of Mrs. Maxfield Grey. Freed of the murder charge, Maxfield and Rosalie are now free to marry.

Cast
Geraldine Farrar as Rosalie Dean
Herbert Rawlinson as Maxfield Grey
Percy Marmont as Frank Grey
Violet Heming as Bertha Grey
Hassard Short as Wally Gage
Maude Turner Gordon as Rosalie's Aunt
Henry Carvill as Attorney Stanfield
Clarence Handyside as American Consul
Ernest Maupain as Casino Manager
Mabel Ballin as Young Girl

Reception
Like many American films of the time, The Girl Who Came Back was subject to restrictions and cuts by city and state film censorship boards. For example, the Chicago Board of Censors required, in Reel 1, that a closeup of a roulette wheel be reduced by half.

References

External links

allmovie/synopsis; The Turn of the Wheel
Still with Geraldine Farrar and Herbert Rawlinson (University of Washington / Sayre collection)

1918 films
American silent feature films
Lost American films
Films directed by Reginald Barker
1918 romantic drama films
American romantic drama films
American black-and-white films
1918 lost films
Lost romantic drama films
1910s American films
Silent romantic drama films
Silent American drama films